Henri de Torrenté (6 December 1845 – 20 January 1922) was a Swiss politician and President of the Swiss Council of States (1894/1895).

He was the father of the diplomat Henry de Torrenté.

External links 
 
 

1845 births
1922 deaths
Members of the Council of States (Switzerland)
Presidents of the Council of States (Switzerland)